"You Feel the Same Way Too" is a song recorded by Canadian music group The Rankin Family. It was released in August 1995 as the lead single from their fourth studio album, Endless Seasons. It peaked in the top 20 on the RPM Adult Contemporary Tracks and Country charts.

Music video
The music video was directed by George Dougherty.

Chart performance

Year-end charts

References

1995 singles
The Rankin Family songs
EMI Records singles
Songs written by Jimmy Rankin
1995 songs